Ashraful Hossain (born 11 September 1989) is a Bangladeshi cricketer. He made three first-class appearances for Chittagong Division in 2008. He was part of Bangladesh's squad for the 2008 Under-19 Cricket World Cup.

References

External links
 

1989 births
Living people
Bangladeshi cricketers
Chittagong Division cricketers
People from Chittagong